Rah is a 1962 studio album by Mark Murphy, arranged by Ernie Wilkins.

This was Murphy's first Riverside Records album, and he is supported by an orchestra including Bill Evans, Wynton Kelly, Urbie Green, Ernie Royal, Clark Terry and Jimmy Cobb.

Reception

Down Beat magazine critic John A. Tynan reviewed the album for the April 12, 1962 issue and stated: "Murphy should thank his lucky stars for, among other things such as his talent, Ernie Wilkins. Wilkins has written a set of arrangements for the young jazz singer that should turn Frank Sinatra green with envy. Much of the album's success is due to the arranger's pen.

The Allmusic review by Eugene Chadbourne awarded the album four stars and said that Rah "has worn well over the years...On tracks such as "Green Dolphin Street," he dives into the rhythm with the relaxed calm of an expert. And when the result can be the harebrained complexity of "Twisted" or the funky timing of "Doodlin'," the wisdom of letting the experts handle the hard work has never been more apparent"

The original version of "My Favourite Things" on the session featured hip lyrics, including lines like "Ol' Ernie Wilkins he sure gives you wings", but these new lyrics were deemed inappropriate by composer Richard Rodgers and as a result Riverside Records/Mark Murphy were asked to substitute a 'straight' shorter version of it, but with the same arrangement. Another track left off the original album is "I'll Be Seeing You" for much the same reason. These original versions (still available in Japan) have become a collector's piece.

Track listing
 "Angel Eyes" (Earl Brent, Matt Dennis) - 3:12
 "On Green Dolphin Street" (Bronislaw Kaper, Ned Washington) - 3:44
 "Stoppin' the Clock" (Kral, Fran Landesman) - 3:10
 "Spring Can Really Hang You up the Most" (Landesman, Tommy Wolf) - 3:49
 "No Tears for Me" (Huddleston, McIntyre) - 3:12
 "Out of This World" (Harold Arlen, Jimmy McHugh, Johnny Mercer) - 4:50
 "Milestones" (Miles Davis) - 2:30
 "My Favorite Things" (Oscar Hammerstein II, Richard Rodgers) - 2:17
 "Doodlin'" (Horace Silver) - 3:30
 "Li'l Darlin'" (Neal Hefti, Jon Hendricks) - 5:01
 "Twisted" (Wardell Gray, Annie Ross) - 2:25
 "I'll Be Seeing You" (only on Milestones 6064) -2:01
 "My Favorite Things" (Long AND short version- only on Milestones 6064) - 2:56 & 2:13
 "It's Like Love" (only on Dutch pressing) - 2:32 (Arranged by Al Cohn)

Personnel
Mark Murphy - vocals
Clark Terry, Blue Mitchell, Joe Wilder, Bernie Glow or Ernie Royal - trumpets
Jimmy Cleveland, Urbie Green or Melba Liston - trombones
Wynton Kelly or Bill Evans - piano
Barry Galbraith or Sam Herman - guitar
George Duvivier or Art Davis - double bass
Jimmy Cobb - drums
Ray Barretto - congas
Ernie Wilkins - arranger, conductor

Production
Orrin Keepnews - producer
Ray Fowler - engineer
Ira Gitler - liner notes
Ken Deardoff - design
Phil DeLancie - digital remastering

References

Riverside Records albums
Albums produced by Orrin Keepnews
Mark Murphy (singer) albums
1961 albums
Albums arranged by Ernie Wilkins
Albums conducted by Ernie Wilkins